Blade of the Immortal is an anime series based on the manga series created by Hiroaki Samura. It was directed by Kōichi Mashimo and produced by Bee Train, with production support by Production I.G and Pony Canyon. Bee Train was responsible for the animation production, Pony Canyon produced the music for the series, and Yoshimitsu Yamashita designed the characters. The story follows the adventures of Manji, a samurai cursed with immortality due to killing one hundred men. Weary of his immortal life, Manji seeks to repent for sins and lift the curse of immortality by killing 1,000 evil men.

The first announcement of the Blade of the Immortal anime was in Kodansha's Afternoon magazine. The series aired from July 14, 2008 to December 29, 2008 on AT-X.

Seven DVD compilation volumes were released by Pony Canyon between August 29, 2008 and February 27, 2009, followed by a DVD-box on November 11, 2010.

A second anime adaptation was listed on the cover of the July issue of Monthly Afternoon on May 10, 2019. It was later announced that the anime adaptation will be a complete adaptation. The series is animated by Liden Films and directed by Hiroshi Hamasaki, with Makoto Fukami handling series composition, Shingo Ogiso designing the characters, and Eiko Ishibashi composing the music. It aired from October 10, 2019 to March 25, 2020 on Amazon Prime Video. On October 15, 2020, Sentai Filmworks announced that they had licensed the anime for home video and released it on Blu-ray Disc on January 19, 2021.

Episode list

2008 series

2019 series

Notes

References
General

Specific

External links
Official website 

Blade of the Immortal
Blade of the Immortal episode lists